Ogcocephalidae is a family of anglerfish specifically adapted for a benthic lifestyle of crawling about on the seafloor. Ogcocephalid anglerfish are sometimes referred to as batfishes, deep-sea batfishes, handfishes, and seabats. They are found in tropical and subtropical oceans worldwide. A few species live in much shallower coastal waters and, exceptionally, may enter river estuaries.

They are dorsoventrally compressed fishes similar in appearance to rays, with a large circular or triangular head (box-shaped in Coelophrys), and a small tail. The illicium (a modified dorsal fin ray on the front of the head supporting the esca, a bulbous lure) may be retracted into an illicial cavity above the mouth. The esca is not luminous, as in most other groups of anglerfishes, but secretes a fluid, lasting approximately two minutes, thought to act as a chemical lure which attracts prey such as crabs, snails, shrimp, and small fish. Analysis of their stomach contents indicates that batfishes feed on fish, crustaceans, and polychaete worms.

The pelvic and anal fins of many species are stout and thick-skinned, so as to support the body off the substrate. These fins also enable batfishes to walk on the seafloor, though the irregular shape of the fins causes most batfishes to swim awkwardly.

This family grouping contains approximately ten genera and 75 known species found in almost all tropical seas around the world.

Gallery

References

  Rade, C. M. (2011). Functional fin morphology of aquatic substrate-based locomotion in ogcocephalid fishes (Lophiiformes;Ogcocephalidae). Integrative and Comparative Biology., 51, E241–E241. 

  Derouen, V. (2015). Examining evolutionary relationships and shifts in depth preferences in batfishes (Lophiiformes: Ogcocephalidae). Molecular Phylogenetics and Evolution., 84, 27–33. https://doi.org/10.1016/j.ympev.2014.12.011

External links 
 

 
Deep sea fish
Marine fish families
Taxa named by David Starr Jordan